This is a list of the named geological faults in Scotland. See the main article on faults for a fuller treatment of fault types and nomenclature but in brief, the main types are normal faults, reverse faults, thrusts, thrust faults or slides and strike-slip faults. Many faults may have acted as both normal faults at one time and as reverse or thrust faults at another and may or may not have also incorporated some degree of strike-slip movement too. The terms 'zone' and 'complex' imply collections of features with associated histories.

Key to tables 
Column 1 indicates the name of the fault. Note that different authors may use different names for the same fault or a section of it. Conversely, the same name may be applied to more than one fault, particularly in the case of smaller faults which are widely separated.
Column 2 indicates the OS grid reference of the approximate midpoint of certain faults. Note that the mapped extent of a fault may not accurately reflect its actual extent.
Column 3 indicates the county in which the fault occurs. Some traverse two or more counties of course.
Column 4 indicates on which sheet, if any, of the British Geological Survey's 1:50,000 / 1" scale geological map series of Scotland, the fault is shown and named (either on map/s or cross-section/s or both). A handful of BGS maps at other scales are listed too.
Column 5 indicates a selection of publications in which references to the fault may be found. See references section for full details of publication.

Alphabetical list of faults

A

B

C

D

E

F

G

H

I,J

K

L

M

N

O

P,Q

R

S

T

U,V

W-Z

References

Maps
 British Geological Survey 2007, Bedrock Geology UK North, 1:625,000 scale geological map, British Geological Survey, Keyworth, Notts (UK (north) 625K)
 British Geological Survey 1996 Tectonic map of Britain, Ireland and Adjacent Areas 1996, Pharaoh TC et al. (compilers), 1:1,500,000 British Geological Survey, Keyworth, Notts (Tect B&Ire 1:1500K)
 British Geological Survey, various of 1:50,000 scale geological maps of Scotland, British Geological Survey, Keyworth, Notts (Sc no.)
 British Geological Survey 'Classic Areas' series; Glencoe, 1:25,000 scale geological map, British Geological Survey, Keyworth, Notts (Glencoe:25K)
 British Geological Survey 'Classic Areas' series; Skye Central Complex, 1:25,000 scale geological map, British Geological Survey, Keyworth, Notts (Skye Central Complex Bedrock 25k)

Books
 Trewin, NH (ed) 2002. The Geology of Scotland, (4th edn) The Geological Society, London (Trewin (ed) 2002)
 British Regional Geology: Orkney and Shetland, British Geological Survey, Nottingham (BGS:BRG1)
 British Regional Geology: Northern Highlands of Scotland, British Geological Survey, Nottingham (BGS:BRG2)
 Emeleus CH & Bell BR 2005, British Regional Geology; The Palaeogene volcanic districts of Scotland (4th edn) British Geological Survey, Nottingham (BGS:BRG3)
 Goodenough, K.M. & Krabbendam, M. 2011 A Geological Excursion Guide to the North-west Highlands of Scotland, Edinburgh Geological Society,  (G & K 2011)
 Grieg, D.C. 1971. British Regional Geology: The South of Scotland (3rd edn) British Geological Survey, Nottingham  (BGS:BRG6). Full text of second edition (1948) available at the Internet Archive.
 Stone et al. 2012. British Regional Geology: South of Scotland (Fourth edn) British Geological Survey, Nottingham  (BGS:BRG6ednIV)
 British Regional Geology: Northern England, British Geological Survey, Nottingham (BGS:BRG7)
 Lintern, B.C. & Floyd, J.D. 2000 Geology of the Kirkcudbright-Dalbeattie District memoir of the British Geological Survey, sheets 5W, 5E and part of 6W (Scotland) (Mem Sc 5W, 5E & pt6W)
 Whitbread, K. Ellen, R. Callaghan, E. Gordon, J.E. and Arkley, S. 2015 East Lothian Geodiversity Audit BGS Open Report OR/14/063 192pp (ELGA)

See also
 List of geological faults of England
 List of geological faults of Northern Ireland
 List of geological faults of Wales
 List of geological folds in Great Britain
 Geological structure of Great Britain

Geology of Scotland
Structural geology
Scotland
Geological faults of Scotland
Geological faults of Scotland